Headcorn railway station is on the South Eastern Main Line in England, serving the village of Headcorn, Kent. It is  down the line from London Charing Cross . The station and all trains that serve the station are operated by Southeastern.

Headcorn was, until 1954, the northern terminus of the Kent & East Sussex Railway although their platform was named .

History 

Headcorn station was opened on 31 August 1842 as part of the extension of the South Eastern Railway's (SER) main line from Tonbridge. In common with other SER stations outside the London area, staggered platforms and a simple single-storey wooden clapboard station building were provided at Headcorn. The SER's line was opened to Ashford by December 1842, to Folkestone by December 1843 and finally to Dover by February 1844. A bridge between Headcorn and Staplehurst was the scene of an accident in 1865 involving Charles Dickens; a rail had been removed by a ganger mistaken as to the day, and the Staplehurst rail crash resulted.

In 1905, the station became the northern terminus of Colonel Stephens' Kent & East Sussex Railway, the KESR's tracks entering Headcorn via a siding on the Ashford side of the station. The KESR had its own long platform to the rear of the Up main line platform, and a corrugated iron building was moved here from the KESR's Tenterden Town station. This involved the demolition of the main line Up platform, its reconstruction opposite the Down platform, and the moving of the KESR's connection to the main line to the west side of the station. A new concrete KESR platform was provided here facing on a curved alignment.

The remodelling included a footbridge across the station and new signal box for the main line and an SR signal for the KESR branch. A connection was also provided between KESR metals and the SR Up loop line on the London side of Headcorn station, the KESR's facilities consisting by now of two loops and a siding.

Following a decline in passenger and freight traffic, the KESR between Headcorn and Tenterden was closed to all traffic in 1954. Goods facilities were withdrawn from Headcorn in 1962, and the goods yard became a car park. The SER's original buildings however survived until 1988 when they were swept away by British Rail as part of a modernisation scheme. A new red-brick station building was officially opened on 11 May 1989 by Ann Widdecombe, then Maidstone's MP; shelters were provided for the platforms. In 1994, a new freight loop was built for Channel Tunnel freight services.

Services 
All services at Headcorn are operated by Southeastern using  EMUs.

The typical off-peak service in trains per hour is:

 2 tph to London Charing Cross
 1 tph to 
 1 tph to  via 

During the peak hours, there are additional services to and from London Cannon Street and the service to Dover Priory is extended to and from Ramsgate via .

References
Citations

Sources

External links

 Headcorn station on "Subterranea Britannica"
 Headcorn station on "Kent Rail"
 Headcorn station in 1940, showing the K&ESR platform.

Borough of Maidstone
Disused railway stations in Kent
DfT Category D stations
Former Kent and East Sussex Railway stations
Railway stations in Kent
Former South Eastern Railway (UK) stations
Railway stations in Great Britain opened in 1842
Railway stations served by Southeastern